() is a set of attire in  which consists of a short jacket typically called  worn under a long Chinese skirt called .

It is the traditional  for the Han Chinese women.

Terminology 

The generic term  can be applied to any style of clothing consisted of a pair of upper and lower garments. The character  is also a generic word for "clothing".

The term  is composed of two Chinese characters:《》and《》; when these characters are combined,  can literally be translated as "jacket skirt". However, the term  is relatively unstable in both original texts and in secondary sources as different regions may use different terms to describe the same clothing.

As a specific term,  refer to a specific style of wearing a short upper garment called  under a long skirt called . The  can also be a short jacket with either short or long sleeves. The Chinese character《》appears in a Sui dynasty rime dictionary called , published in 601 AD, and can be translated as "padded coat", but it can also refer to a lined upper garment. The Xinhua Dictionary defines  as a general term referring to an "upper garment with multiple layers". As such, it is a thick piece of clothing worn mostly during cold seasons.

The term , sometimes literally translated as "unlined upper garment and skirt" in English, is also type of clothing style where the upper garment called  is generally worn over the lower garment, . The Xinhua Dictionary defines  as a general term referring to an "upper garment with a single layer". The Jin dynasty book 《》states that women had been wearing one-piece clothing that has the upper and lower garments connected together since the time of the Yellow Emperor, until the Qin dynasty, when  was invented. 

Historically, the  comes in as varying styles, shapes and lengths, and is usually worn outside of the lower garment. This  was worn by men and women and became popular as it was more convenient for wearing. 

The term  can also refer to long garments.

Cultural significance

Heaven and Earth symbolism 
In traditional Chinese culture, the symbolism of two-pieces garments hold great importance as it symbolizes the greater order of Heaven and Earth. In the 《》, upper garment represents Heaven while the lower garment represents the Earth.

The order between Heaven and Earth can also translate into clothing length differences between men and women. For example, in 1537,  in an attempt to reverse the trend in the late Ming when women clothing was gradually getting longer, Huo Tao, a Ming dynasty Minister of Rites, expressed:

The silhouette of  can also be made into , which looks like an A-line silhouette. The  was a trend in the Wei, Jin, Northern, Southern dynasties. However, during the Ming dynasty,  silhouette created with the use of  reflected an inversion of Heaven and Earth as this form of clothing silhouette contradicts the traditional Chinese principle of Heaven and Earth order.

 is a general term with negative connotation which is employed for what is considered as being strange clothing style, or for deviant dressing styles, or for aberrance in clothing. Clothing which were considered as  typically (i) violates ritual norms and clothing regulations, (ii) are extravagant and luxurious form of clothing, (iii) violates the yin and yang principle, and (iv) are strange and inauspicious form of clothing.

History 

Shang dynasty 

Zhou dynasty 
The  was similar to the one worn in the Shang dynasty period; however the Zhou-dynasty style  was slightly looser and the sleeves could either be broad or narrow. In the Western Zhou dynasty, it was popular to wear  as a set of attire consisting of a jacket and skirt.

Spring and Autumn Period, and Warring States Period 

The  as a set of attire was also worn by men and women during the Warring States period. Elites women in the Warring States period also wore a blouse or a jacket, which was fastened to the right to form a V-shaped collar and was waist-length, along with a long full skirt. The women's blouse tended to have relatively straight and narrow sleeves.

Qin and Han dynasty 
Even though the clothing of the Warring states period were old, they continued to be worn in Qin and Han dynasties, this included the wearing of cross-collared blouse and skirts.

The  as a set of attire was worn during by elite women and ordinary women.

During the Qin and Han dynasties, women wore skirts which was composed of four pieces cloth sewn together; a belt was often attached to the skirt, but the use of a separate belt was sometimes used by women. The popularity of the jacket and skirt combination briefly declined after the fall of the Eastern Han dynasty, but returned into fashion in the Jin and Northern Wei dynasties and continued to be worn until the Qing dynasty.

Wei, Jin, Northern and Southern dynasties 

The  was popular among women during the Wei, Jin, Southern and Northern dynasties. The jacket worn by commoner women was longer than commoner's men. 

Elite women in the Wei and Jin dynasty wore the combination of wide-cuffed, V-shaped, unlined blouse which was made of pattern fabric and was lined at the neck with a decorative strip of cloth, a long skirt which came in different styles, and apron. However, in the early Six dynasties, most ordinary men did not wear  anymore; men, instead wore a set of attire referred as shanku consisting of  ku, trousers, under their cross-collared jacket (i.e. ). The men's jacket were either hip-length or knee-length. The jackets can be tied with a belt or with other forms of closure.

The  (similar to A-line silhouette) style was also a trend in the Wei, Jin, Northern, Southern dynasties, where skirts large and loose giving an elegant and unrestrained effect.

The  found in this period were typically large and loose; the  had a  front and was tied at the waist. Styles of  can be found in the Dunhuang murals where they are worn by the benefactors, in the pottery figurines unearthed in Luoyang, and in the paintings of Gu Kaizhi.

At Luoyang during the Northern Wei dynasty, several variety of clothing styles found on female tomb figures were largely derived from the traditional -style set of attire.

The -style also first appeared in the Northern and Southern dynasties.

Sui and Tang dynasties 

In the Sui dynasty, ordinary men did not wear skirts anymore. In the late sixth century, women's skirts in the Sui dynasty were characterized with high waistline; this kind of high waistline skirt created a silhouette which looked similar to the Empire dresses of Napoleonic France; however, the construction of the assemble differed from the ones worn in Western countries as Han Chinese women assemble consisted of a separate skirt and upper garment which show low décolletage. This trend continued in the early decades of the Tang dynasty when women continued the tend of the Sui and would also wear long, high-waist skirts, low-cut upper garment. 

During the Sui and Tang dynasty, women wore the traditional  in the -style; a style where the skirts were tied higher and higher up the waist until they were eventually tied above the breasts and where short upper garment was worn.

Some Tang dynasty women skirts had accordion pleats. Red coloured skirts were popular. There was also a skirt called "Pomegranate skirt" for its red colour, and another skirt called "Turmeric skirt" for its yellow colour.

By the Mid-Tang period (around the 8th century), the low cleavage upper garment fell out of fashion; the female beauty ideology changed favouring plump and voluptuous beauty.

Song and Liao dynasties

Song dynasty 
Women continued to wear the Tang dynasty's fashion of wearing the upper garment and skirts tied around their breasts until the Song dynasty. In the Song dynasty, the women's skirts were also lowered from the breast level back to the normal waistline. Pleated skirts were introduced and became the main feature of the upper-class women. Song-style  for women consisted of long narrow skirts and jackets which closes to the right. These jackets could be worn over the narrow skirts; this form of  existed in both the Liao dynasty and Song. Cross-collared jackets with narrow sleeves could also be worn under a waist-length skirt or under high-waist skirt.

Liao dynasty 

In Liao dynasty, the Song-style and the Tang-style clothing (including the ) coexisted together; both Khitan women and Han Chinese women in the Liao wore the Han Chinese style Tang-Song dress. Tang-Song style clothing women clothing in Liao also included a long-sleeved, outer jacket with ample sleeves which could cropped or waist-length, was tied with sash in a bow below the breasts to create an empire silhouette. In Northern Liao mural tomb depictions, women who are dressed in Han style clothing are depicted in Tang dynasty fashion whereas in the Southern Liao murals, women dressed in Han style clothing are wearing Song-style clothing.

Yuan dynasty 

In the Yuan dynasty, the Mongols never imposed Mongol customs on the ethnic Han, and they did not force the Han Chinese to wear Mongol clothing. Many Han Chinese and other ethnicity readily adopted Mongol clothing in Northern China to show their allegiance to the Yuan rulers; however, in Southern China, Mongol clothing was rarely seen as both men and women continued to dress in Song-style garments. Tang-Song style clothing also continued to be worn in multiple layers by families who showed that they were resisting the rule of the Mongols. The Song style dress also continued to persist among the southern elites of the Yuan dynasty and evidence of Song-style clothing was also found in the unearthed tombs in southern China. 

Chinese women also wore cross-collar upper garment which had elbow length sleeves (i.e. cross-collar ) over a long-sleeved blouse under a skirt; the abbreviated wrap skirts were also popular in Yuan. Women jackets closing to the right and closing to the left coexisted in the Yuan dynasty. It was also common for Chinese women in the Yuan dynasty to close their clothing to the left side (instead of the right side).

The way of wearing short-length cross-collar upper garment over long narrow skirt was also a Song-style fashion. Long cross-collar upper garment (about the knee-length) over a long skirt could also be worn by Chinese elite women.

Ming dynasty 

In terms of appearance, the Ming dynasty  (i.e. the short jacket and skirt) was similar to the Song dynasty's . Compared to the  worn in the Tang dynasty, the Ming dynasty  was more gentle and elegant in style; it was also less lavish and yet less rigid and strict as the  worn in the Song dynasty. One difference from the Song dynasty  is the addition of a small short waist skirt  which was worn by young maidservants; it is assumed that it was worn as an apron to protect the long skirt under it. The short overskirt was called . Moreover, following the Yuan dynasty, the style of closing the jacket to the left in women's clothing persisted in some geographical areas of the Ming dynasty, or for at least Chinese women who lived in the province of Shanxi. Ming dynasty portrait paintings showing Chinese women dressing in left lapel jackets appeared to be characteristic of ancestral portraits from the province of Shanxi and most likely in the areas neighbouring the province.

By the Ming Dynasty, the  became the most common form of attire for women. The collar was of the same colour as the clothing. Often, there was an optional detachable protective  sewn to the collar. The  can be white or any dark colour, and is used to protect the collar from being rotten by sweat, therefore to extend the life of the clothing. Towards the start of the Qing Dynasty, the skirt was mostly  or mamianqun.

By the late Ming dynasty, jackets with high collars started to appear. The stand-up collar were closed with interlocking buttons made of gold and silver, called zimukou. The appearance of interlocking buckle promoted the emergence and the popularity of the stand-up collar and the Chinese jacket with buttons at the front, and laid the foundation of the use of Chinese knot buckles. In women garments of the Ming dynasty, the stand-up collar with gold and silver interlocking buckles became one of the most distinctive and popular form of clothing structure; it became commonly used in women's clothing reflecting the conservative concept of Ming women's chastity by keeping their bodies covered and due to the climate changes during the Ming dynasty (i.e. the average temperature was low in China).

Qing dynasty 

During the Qing dynasty, the aoqun was the most prominent clothing of Han Chinese women. The ruqun (i.e. short jacket under skirt) continued to be worn in early Qing dynasty, but the later Qing dynasty depictions of ruqun in arts were mostly based on earlier paintings rather than the lived clothing worn by women in this period.

In the late Qing, women wore the long jacket ao with the skirt. It was fashionable to wear the ao (袄) with the baizhequn (百摺裙) and the mamianqun. The ao in the Qing dynasty has a front centre closure and then curves crossover to the right before secured with frog buttons. The front closing, collar, hem, and sleeves cuff have edging of contrasting pipings and side slits. The skirts have a flat front and back panels with knife-pleated sides. In Qing, the high collar continued to be used but it was not a common feature in clothing before the 20th century. In the late Qing, the high collar become more popular and was integrated to the jacket and robe of the Chinese and the Manchu becoming a regular garment feature instead of an occasional feature. The high collar remained a defining feature of their jacket even in the first few years of the republic.

For the Han Chinese women, the stand-up collar became a defining feature of their long jacket; this long jacket with high collar could be worn over their trousers (shanku) but also over their skirts. In The Chinese and Japanese repository published in 1863 by James Summers, Summers described Chinese women wearing a knee-length upper garment which fits closely at the neck; they wore it together with loose trousers with border around the ankles under a skirt, which opens at the front and has large plaits over the hips. Summers also observed that the sleeves of the women's garment are generally long enough to conceal the hands in cold weather; the sleeves were sometimes very wide and were decorated beautifully with embroidered satin lining which would be turned back to form a border. In Mesny's Chinese Miscellany written in 1897 by William Mesny, it was observed that skirts were worn by Chinese women over their trousers in some regions of China, but that in most areas, skirts were only used when women would go out for paying visits. He also observed that the wearing of trousers was a national custom for Chinese women and that trousers were worn in their homes when they would do house chores. Mesny also observed that men (especially farmers, working men and soldiers) around Shanghai also wore skirts in winter.
Another form of ruqun worn in that period is called qungua, which is composed of gua (褂; a jacket with central closure which closes with buttons) worn with a qun (裙) skirt. The gua jacket was a popular form of jacket in Qing and was worn as a summer jacket instead of the ao which was usually worn in winter. The qungua also referred to one style of Qing dynasty wedding dress.

Modern

Republic of China

Wenming xinzhuang 
In the early 1910s and 1920s, young women wore aoqun called Wenming xinzhuang (文明新裝), also known as the "civilized costume" or "civilized attire". It originated from the traditional yishang (衣裳) and the basic style of this clothing is clearly inherited from ancient Han Chinese clothing although the details have changed over time. The Wenming xinzhuang continued the unbroken tradition of Han Chinese women's matching a jacket with a skirt which has been established for thousand of years.

The ao of the Wenming xinzhuang was typically cyan and blue in colour while the long skirt was dark in colour, mostly in black; the ao had no complex ornaments as bindings and embroidery was rejected in this period. There was a narrow trim which would bind the hem and the side vents were rectangular in shape. The ao typically had a standing collar and long in shape with its hemline typically reaching below hip height and sometimes even at knee-height. The sleeves were short and left the wrist exposed. The skirt was derived from the baizhequn (百摺裙) and became a dark long skirt with larger pleats. With time, the skirt length eventually shortened to the point where the calves of the wearer was exposed, and the ao had a lower collar and an arc shaped vents started to appear on both sides. This style of clothing eventually faded in the early 1930s.

21st Century: Modern hanfu 
In the 21st Century, several forms of ruqun, whose design are often based on the previous dynasties traditional ruqun but with modern aesthetics, gained popularity following the Hanfu movement.

Construction and Design 
As a set of garments, the ruqun consists of an upper and lower garment.

The ruqun can be categorized into types based on the waist height of the skirt:

 Mid-rise,
 High-rise and
 Qixiong ruqun (齐胸襦裙; qíxiōngrúqún).

The ruqun can also be categorized based on the collar style. The collar style of the upper garment can be divided into:

 crossed collar,
 parallel collar, also known as straight collar (直领; Zhiling).

Women's skirts 
Throughout history, Han Chinese women wore many kind of skirts which came in variety of styles; some of which had their own specific names.

Types of ruqun 

Mianfu
Qixiong ruqun
Qungua (裙褂): a type of ruqun worn as a Traditional Chinese Wedding dress in Qing and in modern era.
Tanling ruqun:  a type of ruqun with a U-shaped upper garment
Xiuhefu (秀禾服): a type of aoqun worn as a Traditional Chinese Wedding dress in Qing and in modern era.
Xuanduan (玄端): a very formal dark  with accessories; equivalent to the Western white tie.

See also 
 Han Chinese clothing
List of Han Chinese clothing
Shanku

References 

Chinese traditional clothing